The Arden Theatre Company is a full-service professional regional theatre located in Philadelphia, Pennsylvania, offering theatrical and educational productions and programs to artists, audiences, and students of the greater Philadelphia region. The company includes three theatres, which are the 175-seat Arcadia Stage and the 360-seat F. Otto Haas mainstage theatre. In addition the company also has a building at 40 North 2nd Street that is used to house classrooms and administrative and production offices.

History
Founded in 1988 by Terrence J. Nolen, Amy Murphy, and Aaron Posner, Arden Theatre Company began producing at the Walnut Street Theatre Studio. After the second season, the St. Stephen's Performing Arts Center was co-founded to provide a larger theatre (150 seats) and a unified location for classes, education programs, administrative offices and production shops.

In 1994, Arden Theatre Company purchased a  former post office building in Philadelphia's historic Old City neighborhood. The building has been renovated to contain a 360-seat main stage theatre (F. Otto Haas Stage); the 175-seat studio theatre (Arcadia Stage); the Independence Foundation Studio; a bi-level lobby with box office, elevator, and restrooms; rehearsal and classroom space; and administrative and production offices. The company claims that its move played a significant role in the economic revitalization of the area and during his term as Mayor Ed Rendell said of its impact; "When I think of nonprofit organizations that are having a major economic impact on their neighborhoods, none comes to mind sooner than the Arden."

The company has produced over 90 professional productions with 24 world premiere productions among them. As part of its commitment to present new works, the Arden Theatre Company created the Independence Foundation New Play Showcase in 1999. This program aims to stage a new play every season as well as holding workshops and a free public reading of an additional new play. The theatre has also been awarded several grants for past and future development of the arts.

Philanthropy and education
The Arden Theatre company also has an educational program included in the company's Arden Drama School.

Awards
Since The Arden's founding in 1988, the company has garnered numerous awards and honors. This includes eight Philadelphia Magazine "Best of Philly" Awards, four “Theatre Company of the Year” citations from The Philadelphia Inquirer, and six Philadelphia City Paper Reader's choice Awards. Arden Theatre has also received 250 nominations and 53 awards from the Barrymore Awards for Excellence in Theater.

Performances
 Third and Indiana

References

External links

League of Resident Theatres
Theatre companies in Philadelphia
Theatres in Philadelphia
Old City, Philadelphia
1988 establishments in Pennsylvania